Harry Elrington (born 5 December 1993) is an English rugby union player who plays for Gloucester in the Premiership Rugby.

Elrington joined the London Irish academy following his graduation from Loughborough University for the 2015–16 season. He had a loan spell with Rosslyn Park in the National League 1 competition for development. He made his debut in the RFU Championship match with a 36–12 victory over Richmond.

On 7 April 2017, Elrington signed his first professional contract with London Irish, thus promoted to the senior squad from the 2017–18 season. After six seasons playing at Brentford Community Stadium, he departed London Irish to sign for Premiership rivals Gloucester from the 2021–22 season.

Elrington was called up to the England squad on 15 November 2021 as cover for their game against South Africa as part of the 2021 Autumn Nations Series.

References

External links
Gloucester Rugby Profile
ESPN Profile
Its Rugby Profile

1993 births
Living people
English rugby union players
Gloucester Rugby players
London Irish players
Rugby union players from Guildford
Rugby union props